The British Rail Class 85 (also known by the designation AL5) is an electric locomotive that was designed and produced at British Rail’s (BR) Doncaster Works during the early 1960s. While largely developed by BR, much of its systems can be attributed to the British manufacturing interest Associated Electrical Industries (AEI). 

The locomotive was developed as a part of the programme of works to electrify the West Coast Main Line during the late 1950s and early 1960s. BR deliberately opted to procure multiple batches of locomotives from a range of manufacturers, leading to the procurement of five prototype classes (Classes 81-85) and subsequently placed a larger order for a refined model of one of these, eventually leading to the development of the Class 86 locomotive.

The Class 85 proved to be a relatively reliable workhorse of the London Midland region, particularly following a refurbishment during the 1970s that saw the replacement of their rectifiers. Following the retirement of the Class 85, a single example was preserved.

Background
During the late 1950s, British Rail (BR) embarked upon the electrification of the West Coast Main Line, a strategy which necessitated the procurement of a large number of electric locomotives to utilise the newly-installed infrastructure. A detailed specification, listing various performance attributes for such a locomotive, was produced by the British Transport Commission. 

It was decided that, instead of a bulk order from a single manufacturer, several batches of similar locomotives would be ordered from several companies, the first of these being the AL1 series. Further contracts were awarded, including one to BR's own Doncaster Works, to procure a similar locomotive, thus resulting in the Class 85. Under the earlier BR classification, the type was given the designation AL5 (meaning the fifth design of 25 kV AC locomotive), and locomotives were numbered E3056–E3095. 

While BR planned had intended for this procurement strategy to have led to work being spread out to a variety of different manufacturers, many of the systems used across the different prototype classes were similar or in some cases identical, having been supplied by the same firm, the Metropolitan-Vickers division of the British manufacturing group Associated Electrical Industries (AEI). Between 1961 and 1964, a total of forty such locomotives were constructed, all of which were built at Doncaster.

Design 
The Class 85 is an AC electric locomotive intended for express services on the West Coast Main Line. Its design bore considerable similarities to the earlier British Rail Class 81, particularly in terms of their shared AEI-supplied equipment. One key area of difference was its adoption of semiconductor-based rectifiers and a rheostatic braking system; the latter was viewed as likely to generate considerable cost savings in comparison to conventional braking by reducing wheel wear. A small proportion of the locomotive's equipment, such as the bogies, were designed by the French industrial group Alstom.

In order to achieve the minimal weight requirement stipulated by BR, while still maintaining sufficient structural strength, the lower halves of the body sides were merged into the locomotive's underframe, while the roof and sides above the base of the windows were built from a relatively light steel frame with an aluminium covering. The underframe is a welded steel assembly divided into seven box-like sections, while the bogie frame is built from rolled steel members that were welded together. On the outer faces of the underframe, the coupler and oleo-pneumatic buffers were fitted. The locomotive was seated upon each bogie via a double-ended rubber cone-shaped pivot, the alignment of which was defined by a transverse spring anchorage. Much of the weight was carried by two sets of four spring-loaded side-bearers, which used rubber brushes wherever practical to eliminate the need for lubrication.

The Class 85 featured a sizeable power compartment, of which particular attention was paid to making it as accessible for maintenance purposes as was realistically possible. The bulk of the equipment was installed within two compartments, one containing the rectifier apparatus and the other accommodated the main transformer and associated equipment, while a walkway spanned the length of the power compartment for access purposes. Above the transformer was its roof-mounted radiator and cooling fans, while the braking resistors and motor contactor panel were positioned close by. In between the transformer unit and the rear bulkhead was the brake compressor, primary air reservoir, and the fault indicator panel. On the opposite side of the power compartment, next to the forward bulkhead, was the auxiliary compressor, battery charging apparatus, and a chemical toilet for the locomotive crew.

Power was delivered to the locomotive via overhead catenary, which was always energised at 25,000 V AC. However, the main transformer, which was normally operated with the four windings in series, could be operated at 6.25 kV AC with the transformer windings in parallel. This voltage was intended to be used where limited clearances gave concern over use of the higher voltage arcing onto lineside structures, especially those made of cast iron. Since the clearances were found to be adequate, the lower voltage connections were locked out of use. A standardised Stone-Faiveley AMBR pantograph was adopted for the type, which was raised using pressurised air, the power for which was provided via the battery-powered auxiliary air compressor.

Driver's cabs are provided at both ends of the locomotive. The cabs are of double-skin construction, with a sheet steel exterior around a steel frame, and an inner lining of plastic-faced plywood along with fibreglass mouldings for the ceiling. Asbestos was also applied for its thermal insulation and soundproofing properties; several electric heater units were also present each of the cabs. The driving controls, which conformed to BR's standard conventions of the era, were mounted on a sloped plastic-covered desk directly beneath the forward window; various instruments, light switches, indicators, and gauges lined the centre console. The master controller was to the right of the driver while the air brake controls were to the left.

Operational history

By 1965, electrification had spread south to London Euston, allowing for services to be extended shortly thereafter.

The first 30 Class 85 locomotives were built with germanium rectifiers in their power systems, after which the final 10 used silicon-based rectifiers instead. Silicon rectifiers were retrofitted across the whole fleet by the end of 1986.

In 1968, the type was reclassified as Class 85 as a result of BR's introduction of the TOPS numbering system. From 1971 onwards, locomotives were progressively renumbered into the 85001–85040 range. Fourteen locomotives were later converted for freight-only use, numbered in the 85/1 subclass.

Accidents and incidents
 On 23 April 1983, 85027 caught fire while hauling a southbound intermodal train near Kings Langley. It was not returned to service.
 On 13 October 1985, 85001 caught fire while hauling the 16:15 Euston to Manchester service.
 On 27 April 1989, a passenger train hauled by 85012 was derailed near .

Preservation 
One locomotive has been preserved, 85101 (having previously numbered  E3061 & 85006) This locomotive is preserved by the AC Locomotive Group, who also have examples of Classes 81-84 and 86. at Barrow Hill Engine Shed. It was named to commemorate the 150th anniversary of Doncaster Works and is painted in Railfreight Distribution livery, a livery it never carried in service. Their intention is to eventually restore this locomotive to operational condition.

Fleet details

Notes

References

Further reading

External links 

 AC Locomotive Group - Owners of preserved locomotive no. 85101 / E3061

85
Bo-Bo locomotives
25 kV AC locomotives
Railway locomotives introduced in 1961
Standard gauge locomotives of Great Britain